Mia-dong is a dong, neighbourhood of Gangbuk-gu in Seoul, South Korea. From June 30 2008, nine administrative Mia-dongs were divided Mia-dong (Mia 3-dong), Samgaksan-dong (Mia 6 and 7-dong), Samyang-dong (Mia 1 and 2-dong), Songcheon-dong (Mia 5 and 8-dong) and Songjung-dong (Mia 4 and 9-dong). Remained Mia-dong is former Mia 3-dong.

See also
Administrative divisions of South Korea

References

External links
Gangbuk-gu official website
map at the Gangbuk-gu official website
 Mia-dong resident office website

Neighbourhoods of Gangbuk District